The Public Service Medal (PSM) is a civil decoration awarded to Australian public servants (at all levels) for outstanding service. The PSM was introduced in 1989 and replaced the Imperial awards discontinued in 1975, supplementing the Order of Australia introduced that same year. Recipients of the Public Service Medal are entitled to use the post-nominal letters "PSM".

The medal is awarded twice each year by the Governor-General of Australia, on the nomination of the responsible Minister in each state or territory, and at the federal level. The total number of awards made each year must not exceed 100, further broken down into a quota for each government public service.

Description
 The Public Service Medal is a circular nickel-silver medal ensigned with a Federation Star. The obverse shows an inner circle with four planetary gears spaced equally around a sun gear. It is surrounded by the words 'Public Service'. An outer circle shows 36 human figures symbolising a range of occupations and activities.
 The reverse displays a wreath of mimosa surrounding the inscription 'For Outstanding Service'.
 The 32 millimetre-wide ribbon features the national colours of green and gold in a vertical striped pattern.

See also
 Australian Honours Order of Precedence

References

Civil awards and decorations of Australia
Awards established in 1989
1989 establishments in Australia
 
Australian Public Service
Long and Meritorious Service Medals of Britain and the Commonwealth